Brooks's leaf warbler (Phylloscopus subviridis) is a species of Old World warbler in the family Phylloscopidae.

Distribution and habitat
It is found in Afghanistan, India, Kazakhstan, Pakistan, Russia, and Turkmenistan.  Its natural habitats are boreal forests and temperate forests.

History
The Brooks's leaf warbler was described by ornithologist William Edwin Brooks, father of the Canadian bird illustrator Allan Brooks.

References

 Brooks's Leaf Warbler 2010. 

Brooks's leaf warbler
Birds of Afghanistan
Birds of Pakistan
Birds of North India
Brooks's leaf warbler
Taxonomy articles created by Polbot